A university court is an administrative body of a university in the United Kingdom. In England's Oxbridge such a court carries out limited judicial functions; whereas in Scotland it is a university's supreme governing body, analogous to a board of directors or a board of trustees.

In the English universities of Oxford and Cambridge, courts of inferior jurisdiction, administering principles of justice founded on the canon and civil law, but later defined and limited by the common law.

At Oxford University, the judge of the chancellor's court is the vice-chancellor, who is his deputy or assessor; the court has had since 1244 civil jurisdiction, to the exclusion of the king's courts, in all matters and suits wherein a scholar or privileged person of the university is one of the parties, except in actions relating to freehold. It had also, from 1290 downwards, jurisdiction of all injuries and trespasses against the peace, mayhem and felony excepted, but since the Summary Jurisdiction Acts this is possibly no longer exercisable.

The criminal jurisdiction of Cambridge University in cases where any person not a member of the university is a party has ceased, and its jurisdiction over 'light women' (i.e. prostitutes), which was founded on a charter and statute of Elizabeth, was taken away in 1894 by a private act of that year, when an earlier act dealing with them and applicable till then only to Oxford University, was extended to Cambridge University. Before 1891, women of 'light character', who had been convicted of consorting with or soliciting members of the university in statu pupillari, were detained in a house of correction called the spinning house, but in that year a conviction was held bad.

All jurisdiction over non-university matters was removed from both the Oxford and Cambridge courts by the Administration of Justice Act 1977.

Scotland

The university courts were first established for the ancient universities by the Universities (Scotland) Act 1858 and they are responsible for the finances and administration of each university. Each university, subject to approval by the Privy Council of the United Kingdom, determines the constitution of its court, with members coming from within each university, the local community and beyond.

At an ancient university the court is chaired by the rector, who ranks third after the chancellor and vice-chancellor, is elected by all the matriculated students of each university.  Members are also appointed by the general council, academic senate and local authority.

At more modern universities there is usually a chairman or convenor appointed along lines similar to a chairman of the board in a corporation or charity.

The president of the students' representative council is usually a member and lay members are co-opted onto the court.

See also
 Ancient university
 Ancient university governance in Scotland
 Proctor#Education

References

Ancient universities of Scotland
Oxbridge
English law